Argentina competed at the 1988 Winter Olympics in Calgary, Alberta, Canada.

Competitors
The following is the list of number of competitors in the Games.

Alpine skiing

Men

Men's combined

Women

Women's combined

Biathlon

Men

 1 A penalty loop of 150 metres had to be skied per missed target.
 2 One minute added per missed target.

Cross-country skiing

Men

 C = Classical style, F = Freestyle

Luge

Men

References

Official Olympic Reports
sports-reference

Nations at the 1988 Winter Olympics
Winter
1988